Manjak or Manjack or Njak is a Bak language of Guinea-Bissau and Senegal. The language is also known as Kanyop.

In 2006, the total number of speakers was estimated at 315,300, including 184,000 in Guinea-Bissau, 105,000 in Senegal and 26,300 in The Gambia.

Dialects 
The Manjak dialects below are distinct enough that some might be considered separate languages.
Bok (Babok, Sarar, Teixeira Pinto, Tsaam)
Likes-Utsia (Baraa, Kalkus)
Cur (Churo)
Lund
Yu (Pecixe, Siis, Pulhilh)
Unhate (Binhante, Bissau)

The Manjak dialects listed by Wilson (2007) are
Canchungo (kancuŋuʔ) – central dialect
Baboque (babɔk) (formerly Teixeira Pinto) – eastern dialect
Churo – northern dialect
Pecixe (locally called pəhlihl; otherwise pəsiis), on an island to the south
Calequisse (kaləkiis), to the west of Canchungo

Writing system
The official spelling system for Manjak established by the Senegalese government is regulated by Decree No. 2005-983 of 21 October 2005.

References

Further reading

External links
 Decree no. 2005-983 of 21 October 2005 relating to the spelling and the separation of words in Manjakú via the website of the Journal officiel.

Papel languages
Languages of Guinea-Bissau
Languages of Senegal
Languages of the Gambia